Iconostigma morosa is a species of moth of the family Tortricidae. It is found in New Caledonia in the southwest Pacific Ocean.

References

Moths described in 1981
Chlidanotini